This is a comprehensive listing of all the bird species recorded in Black Canyon of the Gunnison National Park, which is in the U.S. state of Colorado. Unless otherwise noted, this list is based on one published by the National Park Service (NPS). The list contains 174 species.

This list is presented in the taxonomic sequence of the Check-list of North and Middle American Birds, 7th edition through the 63rd Supplement, published by the American Ornithological Society (AOS). Common and scientific names are also those of the Check-list, except that the common names of families are from the Clements taxonomy because the AOS list does not include them.

The following codes and definitions are used to annotate some species. The others are residents, seasonal visitors, or migrants which one can expect to see in the proper season and habitat.

(PP) = Probably present - "High confidence species occurs in park but current, verified evidence needed" per the NPS (31 species)
(R) = Rare - "Present, but usually seen only a few times each year" per the NPS (38 species)
(O) = Occasional - "Occurs in the park at least once every few years, varying in numbers, but not necessarily every year" per the NPS (11 species)
(Unk) = Unknown - "Abundance unknown" per the NPS (two species)
(I) = Introduced - a species introduced to North America by humans (five species)

Ducks, geese, and waterfowl

Order: AnseriformesFamily: Anatidae

The family Anatidae includes the ducks and most duck-like waterfowl, such as geese and swans. These birds are adapted to an aquatic existence with webbed feet, bills which are flattened to a greater or lesser extent, and feathers that are excellent at shedding water due to special oils.

Canada goose, Branta canadensis
Blue-winged teal, Spatula discors (PP)
Cinnamon teal, Spatula cyanoptera (PP)
Northern shoveler, Spatula clypeata (PP)
Gadwall, Mareca strepera (PP)
American wigeon, Mareca americana
Mallard, Anas platyrhynchos
Northern pintail, Anas acuta (PP)
Green-winged teal, Anas crecca (PP)
Redhead, Aythya americana (PP)
Lesser scaup, Aythya affinis (PP)
Common goldeneye, Bucephala clangula
Barrow's goldeneye, Bucephala islandica (O)
Hooded merganser, Lophodytes cucullatus (O)
Common merganser, Mergus merganser
Ruddy duck, Oxyura jamaicensis (PP)

New World quail
Order: GalliformesFamily: Odontophoridae

The New World quails are small, plump terrestrial birds only distantly related to the quails of the Old World, but named for their similar appearance and habits.

Gambel's quail, Callipepla gambelii (PP)

Pheasants, grouse, and allies
Order: GalliformesFamily: Phasianidae

Phasianidae consists of the pheasants and their allies. These are terrestrial species, variable in size but generally plump with broad and relatively short wings. Many species are gamebirds or have been domesticated as a food source for humans.

Wild turkey, Meleagris gallopavo (O)
Gunnison sage-grouse, Centrocercus minimus (R)
Dusky grouse, Dendragapus obscurus
Sharp-tailed grouse, Tympanuchus phasianellus (H)
Ring-necked pheasant, Phasianus colchicus (I) (O)
Chukar, Alectoris chukar (I) (R)

Grebes
Order: PodicipediformesFamily: Podicipedidae

Grebes are small to medium-large freshwater diving birds. They have lobed toes and are excellent swimmers and divers. However, they have their feet placed far back on the body, making them quite ungainly on land.

Pied-billed grebe, Podilymbus podiceps (PP)

Pigeons and doves

Order: ColumbiformesFamily: Columbidae

Pigeons and doves are stout-bodied birds with short necks and short slender bills with a fleshy cere.

Rock pigeon, Columba livia (I)
Band-tailed pigeon, Patagioenas fasciata (R)
Mourning dove, Zenaida macroura

Nightjars and allies
Order: CaprimulgiformesFamily: Caprimulgidae

Nightjars, also called goatsuckers, are medium-sized nocturnal birds that usually nest on the ground. They have long wings, short legs, and very short bills. Most have small feet, of little use for walking, and long pointed wings. Their soft plumage is cryptically colored to resemble bark or leaves.

Common nighthawk,  Chordeiles minor
Common poorwill,  Phalaenoptilus nuttallii

Hummingbirds

Order: ApodiformesFamily: Trochilidae

Hummingbirds are small birds capable of hovering in mid-air due to the rapid flapping of their wings. They are the only birds that can fly backwards.

Black-chinned hummingbird, Archilochus alexandri (R)
Calliope hummingbird, Selasphorus calliope (PP)
Rufous hummingbird, Selasphorus rufus
Broad-tailed hummingbird, Selasphorus platycercus

Rails, gallinules, and coots
Order: GruiformesFamily: Rallidae

Rallidae is a large family of small to medium-sized birds which includes the rails, crakes, coots, and gallinules. The most typical family members occupy dense vegetation in damp environments near lakes, swamps, or rivers. In general they are shy and secretive birds, making them difficult to observe. Most species have strong legs and long toes which are well adapted to soft uneven surfaces. They tend to have short, rounded wings and tend to be weak fliers.

American coot, Fulica americana (PP)

Cranes
Order: GruiformesFamily: Gruidae

Cranes are large, long-legged, and long-necked birds. Unlike the similar-looking but unrelated herons, cranes fly with necks outstretched, not pulled back. Most have elaborate and noisy courting displays or "dances".

Sandhill crane, Antigone canadensis

Plovers and lapwings
Order: CharadriiformesFamily: Charadriidae

The family Charadriidae includes the plovers, dotterels, and lapwings. They are small to medium-sized birds with compact bodies, short thick necks, and long, usually pointed, wings. They are found in open country worldwide, mostly in habitats near water.

Killdeer, Charadrius vociferus

Sandpipers and allies
Order: CharadriiformesFamily: Scolopacidae

Scolopacidae is a large diverse family of small to medium-sized shorebirds including the sandpipers, curlews, godwits, shanks, tattlers, woodcocks, snipes, dowitchers, and phalaropes. The majority of these species eat small invertebrates picked out of the mud or soil. Different lengths of legs and bills enable multiple species to feed in the same habitat, particularly on the coast, without direct competition for food.

Wilson's snipe, Gallinago delicata (PP)
Spotted sandpiper, Actitis macularia

Gulls, terns, and skimmers
Order: CharadriiformesFamily: Laridae

Laridae is a family of medium to large seabirds and includes jaegers, skuas, gulls, terns, kittiwakes, and skimmers. They are typically gray or white, often with black markings on the head or wings. They have stout, longish bills and webbed feet.

Franklin's gull, Leucophaeus pipixcan (PP)
Ring-billed gull, Larus delawarensis (PP)
California gull, Larus californicus (PP)

Herons, egrets, and bitterns

Order: PelecaniformesFamily: Ardeidae

The family Ardeidae contains the herons, egrets, and bitterns. Herons and egrets are medium to large wading birds with long necks and legs. Bitterns tend to be shorter necked and more secretive. Members of Ardeidae fly with their necks retracted, unlike other long-necked birds such as storks, ibises, and spoonbills.

Great blue heron, Ardea herodias
Black-crowned night-heron, Nycticorax nycticorax (PP)

New World vultures

Order: CathartiformesFamily: Cathartidae

The New World vultures are not closely related to Old World vultures, but superficially resemble them because of convergent evolution. Like the Old World vultures, they are scavengers, however, unlike Old World vultures, which find carcasses by sight, New World vultures have a good sense of smell with which they locate carcasses.

Turkey vulture, Cathartes aura

Osprey
Order: AccipitriformesFamily: Pandionidae

Pandionidae is a monotypic family of fish-eating birds of prey. Its single species possesses a very large and powerful hooked beak, strong legs, strong talons, and keen eyesight.

Osprey, Pandion haliaetus (R)

Hawks, eagles, and kites

Order: AccipitriformesFamily: Accipitridae

Accipitridae is a family of birds of prey which includes hawks, eagles, kites, harriers, and Old World vultures. These birds have very large powerful hooked beaks for tearing flesh from their prey, strong legs, powerful talons, and keen eyesight.

Golden eagle, Aquila chrysaetos
Northern harrier, Circus hudsonius
Sharp-shinned hawk, Accipiter striatus
Cooper's hawk, Accipiter cooperii
Northern goshawk, Accipiter gentilis (R)
Bald eagle, Haliaeetus leucocephalus
Swainson's hawk, Buteo swainsoni (R)
Red-tailed hawk, Buteo jamaicensis
Rough-legged hawk, Buteo lagopus (PP)
Ferruginous hawk, Buteo regalis (PP)

Barn-owls
Order: StrigiformesFamily: Tytonidae

Barn-owls are medium to large owls with large heads and characteristic heart-shaped faces. They have long strong legs with powerful talons.

Barn owl, Tyto alba (O)

Owls
Order: StrigiformesFamily: Strigidae

Typical owls are small to large solitary nocturnal birds of prey. They have large forward-facing eyes and ears, a hawk-like beak, and a conspicuous circle of feathers around each eye called a facial disk.

Flammulated owl, Psiloscops flammeolus (O)
Great horned owl, Bubo virginianus
Northern pygmy-owl, Glaucidium gnoma (R)
Long-eared owl, Asio otus (R)
Northern saw-whet owl, Aegolius acadicus (R)

Kingfishers
Order: CoraciiformesFamily: Alcedinidae

Kingfishers are medium-sized birds with large heads, long pointed bills, short legs, and stubby tails.

Belted kingfisher, Megaceryle alcyon (R)

Woodpeckers

Order: PiciformesFamily: Picidae

Woodpeckers are small to medium-sized birds with chisel-like beaks, short legs, stiff tails, and long tongues used for capturing insects. Some species have feet with two toes pointing forward and two backward, while several species have only three toes. Many woodpeckers have the habit of tapping noisily on tree trunks with their beaks.

Lewis's woodpecker, Melanerpes lewis (R)
Williamson's sapsucker, Sphyrapicus thyroideus (R)
Red-naped sapsucker, Sphyrapicus nuchalis (R)
American three-toed woodpecker, Picoides dorsalis
Downy woodpecker, Dryobates pubescens (R)
Hairy woodpecker, Dryobates villosus (R)
Northern flicker, Colaptes auratus

Falcons and caracaras

Order: FalconiformesFamily: Falconidae

Falconidae is a family of diurnal birds of prey, notably the falcons and caracaras. They differ from hawks, eagles, and kites in that they kill with their beaks instead of their talons.

American kestrel, Falco sparverius
Merlin, Falco columbarius (O)
Peregrine falcon, Falco peregrinus
Prairie falcon, Falco mexicanus

Tyrant flycatchers

Order: PasseriformesFamily: Tyrannidae

Tyrant flycatchers are Passerine birds which occur throughout North and South America. They superficially resemble the Old World flycatchers, but are more robust and have stronger bills. They do not have the sophisticated vocal capabilities of the songbirds. Most, but not all, are rather plain. As the name implies, most are insectivorous.

Ash-throated flycatcher, Myiarchus cinerascens
Western kingbird, Tyrannus verticalis (R)
Olive-sided flycatcher, Contopus cooperi (R)
Western wood-pewee, Contopus sordidulus
Willow flycatcher, Empidonax traillii (PP)
Hammond's flycatcher, Empidonax hammondii (R)
Gray flycatcher, Empidonax wrightii
Dusky flycatcher, Empidonax oberholseri
Cordilleran flycatcher, Empidonax occidentalis
Say's phoebe, Sayornis saya

Vireos, shrike-babblers, and erpornis
Order: PasseriformesFamily: Vireonidae

The vireos are a group of small to medium-sized passerine birds restricted to the New World, though a few other members of the family are found in Asia. They are typically greenish in color and resemble wood warblers apart from their heavier bills.

Gray vireo, Vireo vicinior (R)
Plumbeous vireo, Vireo plumbeus
Warbling vireo, Vireo gilvus

Shrikes
Order: PasseriformesFamily: Laniidae

Shrikes are passerine birds known for their habit of catching other birds and small animals and impaling the uneaten portions of their bodies on thorns. A shrike's beak is hooked, like that of a typical bird of prey.

Loggerhead shrike, Lanius ludovicianus (R)
Northern shrike, Lanius borealis (PP)

Crows, jays, and magpies

Order: PasseriformesFamily: Corvidae

The family Corvidae includes crows, ravens, jays, choughs, magpies, treepies, nutcrackers, and ground jays. Corvids are above average in size among the Passeriformes, and some of the larger species show high levels of intelligence.

Canada jay, Perisoreus canadensis (PP)
Pinyon jay, Gymnorhinus cyanocephalus
Steller's jay, Cyanocitta stelleri
Woodhouse's scrub-jay, Aphelocoma woodhouseii
Clark's nutcracker, Nucifraga columbiana
Black-billed magpie, Pica hudsonia
American crow, Corvus brachyrhynchos (R)
Common raven, Corvus corax

Tits, chickadees, and titmice

Order: PasseriformesFamily: Paridae

The Paridae are mainly small stocky woodland species with short stout bills. Some have crests. They are adaptable birds, with a mixed diet including seeds and insects.

Black-capped chickadee, Poecile atricapilla
Mountain chickadee, Poecile gambeli
Juniper titmouse, Baeolophus ridgwayi

Larks
Order: PasseriformesFamily: Alaudidae

Larks are small terrestrial birds with often extravagant songs and display flights. Most larks are fairly dull in appearance. Their food is insects and seeds.

Horned lark, Eremophila alpestris (R)

Swallows

Order: PasseriformesFamily: Hirundinidae

The family Hirundinidae is adapted to aerial feeding. They have a slender streamlined body, long pointed wings and a short bill with a wide gape. The feet are adapted to perching rather than walking, and the front toes are partially joined at the base.

Tree swallow, Tachycineta bicolor
Violet-green swallow, Tachycineta thalassina
Barn swallow, Hirundo rustica
Cliff swallow, Petrochelidon pyrrhonota

Long-tailed tits
Order: PasseriformesFamily: Aegithalidae

Long-tailed tits are a group of small passerine birds with medium to long tails. They make woven bag nests in trees. Most eat a mixed diet which includes insects.

Bushtit, Psaltriparus minimus

Kinglets

Order: PasseriformesFamily: Regulidae

The kinglets are a small family of birds which resemble the titmice. They are very small insectivorous birds in the genus Regulus. The adults have colored crowns, giving rise to their names.

Ruby-crowned kinglet, Corthylio calendula
Golden-crowned kinglet, Regulus satrapa (PP)

Waxwings
Order: PasseriformesFamily: Bombycillidae

The waxwings are a group of passerine birds with soft silky plumage and unique red tips to some of the wing feathers. In the Bohemian and cedar waxwings, these tips look like sealing wax and give the group its name. These are arboreal birds of northern forests. They live on insects in summer and berries in winter.

Bohemian waxwing, Bombycilla garrulus (PP)
Cedar waxwing, Bombycilla cedrorum (PP)

Nuthatches

Order: PasseriformesFamily: Sittidae

Nuthatches are small woodland birds. They have the unusual ability to climb down trees head first, unlike other birds which can only go upwards. Nuthatches have big heads, short tails, and powerful bills and feet.

Red-breasted nuthatch, Sitta canadensis (R)
White-breasted nuthatch, Sitta carolinensis
Pygmy nuthatch, Sitta pygmaea (O)

Treecreepers
Order: PasseriformesFamily: Certhiidae

Treecreepers are small woodland birds, brown above and white below. They have thin pointed down-curved bills, which they use to extricate insects from bark. They have stiff tail feathers, like woodpeckers, which they use to support themselves on vertical trees.

Brown creeper, Certhia americana (R)

Gnatcatchers
Order: PasseriformesFamily: Polioptilidae

These dainty birds resemble Old World warblers in their structure and habits, moving restlessly through the foliage seeking insects. The gnatcatchers are mainly soft bluish gray in color and have the typical insectivore's long sharp bill. Many species have distinctive black head patterns (especially males) and long, regularly cocked, black-and-white tails.

Blue-gray gnatcatcher, Polioptila caerulea

Wrens
Order: PasseriformesFamily: Troglodytidae

Wrens are small and inconspicuous birds, except for their loud songs. They have short wings and thin down-turned bills. Several species often hold their tails upright. All are insectivorous.

Rock wren, Salpinctes obsoletus
Canyon wren, Catherpes mexicanus
Bewick's wren, Thryomanes bewickii
House wren, Troglodytes aedon

Mockingbirds and thrashers

Order: PasseriformesFamily: Mimidae

The mimids are a family of passerine birds which includes thrashers, mockingbirds, tremblers, and the New World catbirds. These birds are notable for their vocalization, especially their remarkable ability to mimic a wide variety of birds and other sounds heard outdoors. The species tend towards dull grays and browns in their appearance.

Gray catbird, Dumetella carolinensis (O)
Brown thrasher, Toxostoma rufum (O)
Sage thrasher, Oreoscoptes montanus (R)
Northern mockingbird, Mimus polyglottos (Unk)

Starlings
Order: PasseriformesFamily: Sturnidae

Starlings are small to medium-sized passerine birds with strong feet. Their flight is strong and direct and they are very gregarious. Their preferred habitat is fairly open country, and they eat insects and fruit. Plumage is typically dark with a metallic sheen.

European starling, Sturnus vulgaris (I)

Dippers
Order: PasseriformesFamily: Cinclidae

Dippers are a group of perching birds whose habitat includes aquatic environments in the Americas, Europe, and Asia. They are named for their bobbing or dipping movements. These birds have adaptations which allows them to submerge and walk on the bottom to feed on insect larvae.

American dipper, Cinclus mexicanus

Thrushes and allies

Order: PasseriformesFamily: Turdidae

The thrushes are a group of passerine birds that occur mainly but not exclusively in the Old World. They are plump, soft plumaged, small to medium-sized insectivores or sometimes omnivores, often feeding on the ground. Many have attractive songs.

Western bluebird, Sialia mexicana
Mountain bluebird, Sialia currucoides
Townsend's solitaire, Myadestes townsendi
Swainson's thrush, Catharus ustulatus
Hermit thrush, Catharus guttatus
American robin, Turdus migratorius

Old World sparrows
Order: PasseriformesFamily: Passeridae

Old World sparrows are small passerine birds. In general, sparrows tend to be small plump brownish or grayish birds with short tails and short powerful beaks. Sparrows are seed eaters, but they also consume small insects.

House sparrow, Passer domesticus (I) (R)

Wagtails and pipits
Order: PasseriformesFamily: Motacillidae

Motacillidae is a family of small passerine birds with medium to long tails. They include the wagtails, longclaws, and pipits. They are slender ground-feeding insectivores of open country.

American pipit, Anthus rubescens (PP)

Finches, euphonias, and allies

Order: PasseriformesFamily: Fringillidae

Finches are seed-eating passerine birds that are small to moderately large and have a strong beak, usually conical and in some species very large. All have twelve tail feathers and nine primaries. These birds have a bouncing flight with alternating bouts of flapping and gliding on closed wings, and most sing well.

Evening grosbeak, Coccothraustes vespertinus (R)
Pine grosbeak, Pinicola enucleator (PP)
Gray-crowned rosy-finch, Leucosticte tephrocotis (R)
Black rosy-finch, Leucosticte atrata (R)
Brown-capped rosy-finch, Leucosticte australis (PP)
House finch, Haemorhous mexicanus (R)
Cassin's finch, Haemorhous cassinii (R)
Red crossbill, Loxia curvirostra (R)
Pine siskin, Spinus pinus
Lesser goldfinch, Spinus psaltria
American goldfinch, Spinus tristis

New World sparrows

Order: PasseriformesFamily: Passerellidae

Until 2017, these species were considered part of the family Emberizidae. Most of the species are known as sparrows, but these birds are not closely related to the Old World sparrows which are in the family Passeridae. Many of these have distinctive head patterns.

Black-throated sparrow, Amphispiza bilineata (R)
Lark sparrow, Chondestes grammacus (R)
Chipping sparrow, Spizella passerina
Brewer's sparrow, Spizella breweri
American tree sparrow, Spizelloides arborea (PP)
Dark-eyed junco, Junco hyemalis
White-crowned sparrow, Zonotrichia leucophrys
Vesper sparrow, Pooecetes gramineus
Song sparrow, Melospiza melodia
Lincoln's sparrow, Melospiza lincolnii (PP)
Green-tailed towhee, Pipilo chlorurus
Spotted towhee, Pipilo maculatus

Yellow-breasted chat
Order: PasseriformesFamily: Icteriidae

This species was historically placed in the wood-warblers (Parulidae) but nonetheless most authorities were unsure if it belonged there. It was placed in its own family in 2017.

Yellow-breasted chat, Icteria virens (R)

Troupials and allies
Order: PasseriformesFamily: Icteridae

The icterids are a group of small to medium-sized, often colorful passerine birds restricted to the New World and include the grackles, New World blackbirds, and New World orioles. Most species have black as a predominant plumage color, often enlivened by yellow, orange, or red.

Western meadowlark, Sturnella neglecta
Bullock's oriole, Icterus bullockii (R)
Red-winged blackbird, Agelaius phoeniceus
Brown-headed cowbird, Molothrus ater
Brewer's blackbird, Euphagus cyanocephalus

New World warblers

Order: PasseriformesFamily: Parulidae

The wood warblers are a group of small often colorful passerine birds restricted to the New World. Most are arboreal, but some, like the ovenbird and the two waterthrushes, are more terrestrial. Most members of this family are insectivores.

Orange-crowned warbler, Leiothlypis celata
Virginia's warbler, Leiothlypis virginiae
MacGillivray's warbler, Geothlypis tolmiei
Yellow warbler, Setophaga petechia
Yellow-rumped warbler, Setophaga coronata
Black-throated gray warbler, Setophaga nigrescens
Townsend's warbler, Setophaga townsendi (R)
Wilson's warbler, Cardellina pusilla

Cardinals and allies

Order: PasseriformesFamily: Cardinalidae

The cardinals are a family of robust, seed-eating birds with strong bills. They are typically associated with open woodland. The sexes usually have distinct plumages.

Western tanager, Piranga ludoviciana
Black-headed grosbeak, Pheucticus melanocephalus
Blue grosbeak, Passerina caerulea (Unk)
Lazuli bunting, Passerina amoena
Indigo bunting, Passerina cyanea (O)

See also
List of birds
Lists of birds by region
List of North American birds
List of birds of Colorado
List of birds of Rocky Mountain National Park

References

External links
Colorado Field Ornithologists

Colorado, Black Canyon
Birds